Frederick Herbert (26 October 1897–1945) was an English footballer who played in the Football League for Coventry City.

References

1897 births
1945 deaths
English footballers
Association football forwards
English Football League players
Bedworth United F.C. players
Coventry City F.C. players
Brierley Hill Alliance F.C. players
Footballers from Warwickshire
People from Warwick